Sabina Welserin, otherwise unknown, was the author of a German cookbook, Das Kochbuch der Sabina Welserin, which she dated 1553 in her brief epigraph. The Welser were members of the mercantile patriciate of Augsburg, international mercantile bankers and venture capitalists on a par with the Fugger and the Hochstetter. The manuscript was edited by Hugo Stopp and published as Das Kochbuch der Sabina Welserin. (Heidelberg: Carl Winter Universitätsverlag) 1980. It is one of a very few primary sources for the history of German cuisine.

References

External links
Sabina Welserin's cookbook, translated into English by Valoise Armstrong, 1998

Welserin, Sabina, Das Kochbuch
Year of death unknown
Year of birth unknown
16th-century German writers
16th-century German women writers
German food writers